Attalus I, surnamed Soter ("Savior"; 269–197 BC) ruled Pergamon, an Ionian Greek polis (what is now Bergama, Turkey), first as a dynast, later as king, from 241 BC to 197 BC. He was the first cousin once removed and the adopted son of Eumenes I, whom he succeeded, and was the first of the Attalid dynasty to assume the title of king in 238 BC. He was the son of Attalus and his wife Antiochis.

Attalus won an important victory over the Galatians, newly arrived Celtic tribes from Thrace, who had been, for more than a generation, plundering and exacting tribute throughout most of Asia Minor without any serious check. This victory, celebrated by the triumphal monument at Pergamon (famous for its Dying Gaul) and the liberation from the Gallic "terror" which it represented, earned for Attalus the name of "Soter", and the title of "king". A courageous and capable general and loyal ally of Rome, he played a significant role in the first and second Macedonian Wars, waged against Philip V of Macedon. He conducted numerous naval operations, harassing Macedonian interests throughout the Aegean, winning honors, collecting spoils, and gaining for Pergamon possession of the Greek islands of Aegina during the first war, and Andros during the second, twice narrowly escaping capture at the hands of Philip.

Attalus was a protector of the Greek cities of Anatolia and viewed himself as the champion of Greeks against barbarians. During his reign he established Pergamon as a considerable power in the Greek East. He died in 197 BC, shortly before the end of the second war, at the age of 72, having suffered an apparent stroke while addressing a Boeotian war council some months before. He and his wife were admired for their rearing of their four sons. He was succeeded as king by his son Eumenes II.

Early life

Little is known about Attalus' early life. He was born a Greek, the son of Attalus, and Antiochis. The elder Attalus was the son of a brother (also called Attalus) of both Philetaerus, the founder of the Attalid dynasty, and Eumenes, the father of Eumenes I, Philetaerus' successor; he is mentioned, along with his uncles, as a benefactor of Delphi, won fame as a charioteer, winning at Olympia, and was honored with a monument at Pergamon.

Attalus was a young child when his father died, sometime before 241 BC, after which he was adopted by Eumenes I, the incumbent dynast. Attalus' mother, Antiochis, was related to the Seleucid royal family (being a granddaughter of Seleucus I Nicator) with her marriage to Attalus' father likely arranged by Philetaerus to solidify his power. This would be consistent with the conjecture that Attalus' father had been Philetaerus' heir designate, but was succeeded by Eumenes, since Attalus I was too young when his father died.

Defeat of the Galatians

According to the 2nd century AD Greek writer Pausanias, "the greatest of his achievements" was the defeat of the "Gauls". Pausanias was referring to the Galatians, immigrant Celts from Thrace, who had recently settled in Galatia in central Asia Minor, and whom the Romans and Greeks called Gauls, associating them with the Celts of what is now France, Switzerland, and northern Italy. Since the time of Philetaerus, the first Attalid ruler, the Galatians had posed a problem for Pergamon, indeed for all of Asia Minor, by exacting tributes to avoid war or other repercussions. Eumenes I had (probably), along with other rulers, dealt with the Galatians by paying these tributes. Attalus however refused to pay them, being the first such ruler to do so. As a consequence, the Galatians set out to attack Pergamon. Attalus met them near the sources of the river Caïcus and won a decisive victory, after which, following the example of Antiochus I, Attalus took the name of Soter, which means "savior", and claimed the title of king. The victory brought Attalus legendary fame. A story arose, related by Pausanias, of an oracle who had foretold these events a generation earlier:

Pausanias adds that by "son of a bull" the oracle "meant Attalus, king of Pergamon, who was styled bull-horned". On the acropolis of Pergamon was erected a triumphal monument, which included the famous sculpture the Dying Gaul, commemorating this battle.

Conquests in Seleucid Asia Minor
Several years after the first victory over the Gauls, Pergamon was again attacked by the Gauls together with their ally Antiochus Hierax, the younger brother of Seleucus II Callinicus, and ruler of Seleucid Asia Minor from his capital at Sardis. Attalus defeated the Gauls and Antiochus at the Battle of Aphrodisium and again at a second battle in the east. Subsequent battles were fought and won against Antiochus alone: in Hellespontine Phrygia, where Antiochus was perhaps seeking refuge with his father-in law, Ziaelas the king of Bithynia; near Sardis in the spring of 228 BC; and, in the final battle of the campaign, further south in Caria on the banks of the Harpasus, a tributary of the Maeander.

As a result of these victories, Attalus gained control over all of Seleucid Asia Minor north of the Taurus Mountains. He was able to hold on to these gains in the face of repeated attempts by Seleucus III Ceraunus, eldest son and successor of Seleucus II, to recover the lost territory, culminating in Seleucus III himself crossing the Taurus, only to be assassinated by members of his army in 223 BC. Achaeus, who had accompanied Seleucus III, assumed control of the army. He was offered and refused the kingship in favor of Seleucus III's younger brother Antiochus III the Great, who then made Achaeus governor of Seleucid Asia Minor north of the Taurus. Within two years Achaeus had recovered all the lost Seleucid territories, "shut up Attalus within the walls of Pergamon", and assumed the title of king.

After a period of peace, in 218 BC, while Achaeus was involved in an expedition to Selge south of the Taurus, Attalus, with some Thracian Gauls, recaptured his former territories. However Achaeus returned from victory in Selge in 217 BC and resumed hostilities with Attalus.

Under a treaty of alliance with Attalus, Antiochus crossed the Taurus in 216 BC, attacked Achaeus and besieged Sardis, and in 214 BC, the second year of the siege, was able to take the city. However the citadel remained under Achaeus' control. Under the pretense of a rescue, Achaeus was finally captured and put to death, and the citadel surrendered. By 213 BC, Antiochus had regained control of all of his Asiatic provinces.

First Macedonian War

Thwarted in the east, Attalus now turned his attention westward. Perhaps because of concern for the ambitions of Philip V of Macedon, Attalus had sometime before 219 BC become allied with Philip's enemies the Aetolian League, a union of Greek states in Aetolia in central Greece, having funded the fortification of Elaeus, an Aetolian stronghold in Calydonia, near the mouth of the river Acheloos.

Philip's alliance with Hannibal of Carthage in 215 BC also caused concern in Rome, then involved in the Second Punic War.  In 211 BC, a treaty was signed between Rome and the Aetolian League, a provision of which allowed for the inclusion of certain allies of the League, Attalus being one of these. Attalus was elected one of the two strategoi (generals) of the Aetolian League, and in 210 BC his troops probably participated in capturing the island of Aegina, acquired by Attalus as his base of operations in Greece.

In the following spring (209 BC), Philip marched south into Greece. Under command of Pyrrhias, Attalus' colleague as strategos, the allies lost two battles at Lamia. Attalus himself went to Greece in July and was joined on Aegina by the Roman proconsul P. Sulpicius Galba who wintered there. The following summer (208 BC) the combined fleet of thirty-five Pergamene and twenty-five Roman ships failed to take Lemnos, but occupied and plundered the countryside of the island of Peparethos (Skopelos), both Macedonian possessions. Attalus and Sulpicius then attended a meeting in Heraclea Trachinia of the Council of the Aetolians, at which the Roman argued against making peace with Philip.

When hostilities resumed, they sacked both Oreus, on the northern coast of Euboea and Opus, the chief city of eastern Locris. The spoils from Oreus had been reserved for Sulpicius, who returned there, while Attalus stayed to collect the spoils from Opus. With their forces divided, Philip attacked Opus. Attalus, caught by surprise, was barely able to escape to his ships.

Attalus was now forced to return to Asia, for he had learned at Opus that, at the instigation of Philip, Prusias I king of Bithynia, related to Philip by marriage, was moving against Pergamon. Soon after, the Romans also abandoned Greece to concentrate their forces against Hannibal, their objective of preventing Philip from aiding Hannibal having been achieved. In 206 BC the Aetolians sued for peace on conditions imposed by Philip. A treaty was drawn up at Phoenice in 205 BC, formally ending the First Macedonian War. Attalus was included as an adscriptus on the side of Rome. He retained Aegina, but had accomplished little else. Since Prusias was also included in the treaty, the war between Attalus and Prusias must also have ended by that time.

Introduction of the cult of the Magna Mater to Rome
In 205 BC, following the "Peace of Phoenice", Rome turned to Attalus, as its only friend in Asia, for help concerning a religious matter. An unusual number of meteor showers caused concern in Rome, and an inspection was made of the Sibylline Books, which discovered verses saying that if a foreigner were to make war on Italy, he could be defeated if the Magna Idaea, the Mother Goddess, associated with Mount Ida in Phrygia, were brought to Rome. Hoping to bring about a speedy conclusion to the war with Hannibal, a distinguished delegation, led by M. Valerius Laevinus, was dispatched to Pergamon, to seek Attalus' aid. According to Livy, Attalus received the delegation warmly, and  "handed over to them the sacred stone which the natives declared to be 'the Mother of the Gods', and bade them carry it to Rome." In Rome the goddess became known as the Magna Mater.

Macedonian hostilities of 201 BC
Prevented by the treaty of Phoenice from expansion in the west, Philip set out to extend his power in the Aegean and in Asia Minor. In the spring of 201 BC he took Samos and the Egyptian fleet stationed there. He then besieged Chios to the north. These events caused Attalus, allied with Rhodes, Byzantium and Cyzicus, to enter the war. A large naval battle occurred in the strait between Chios and the mainland, just southwest of Erythrae. According to Polybius, fifty-three decked warships and over one hundred and fifty smaller warships, took part on the Macedonian side, with sixty-five decked warships and a number of smaller warships on the allied side. During the battle Attalus, having become isolated from his fleet and pursued by Philip, was forced to run his three ships ashore, narrowly escaping by spreading various royal treasures on the decks of the grounded ships, causing his pursuers to abandon the pursuit in favor of plunder.

The same year, Philip invaded Pergamon; although unable to take the easily defended city, in part due to precautions taken by Attalus to provide for additional fortifications, he demolished the surrounding temples and altars.
Meanwhile, Attalus and Rhodes sent envoys to Rome, to register their complaints against Philip.

Second Macedonian War
In 200 BC, Attalus became involved in the Second Macedonian War. Acarnanians with Macedonian support invaded Attica, causing Athens, which had previously maintained its neutrality, to seek help from the enemies of Philip. Attalus, with his fleet at Aegina, received an embassy from Athens, to come to the city for consultations. A few days later, he learned that Roman ambassadors were also at Athens, and decided to go there at once. His reception at Athens was extraordinary. Polybius writes:

Sulpicius Galba, now consul, convinced Rome to declare war on Philip and asked Attalus to meet up with the Roman fleet and again conduct a naval campaign, harassing Macedonian possessions in the Aegean. In the spring of 199 BC, the combined Pergamon and Roman fleets took Andros in the Cyclades, the spoils going to the Romans and the island to Attalus.  From Andros they sailed south, made a fruitless attack on another Cycladic island, Kithnos, turned back north, scavenged the fields of Skiathos off the coast of Magnesia, for food, and continued north to Mende, where the fleets were wracked by storm. On land they were repulsed at Cassandrea, suffering heavy loss. They continued northeast along the Macedonian coast to Acanthus, which they sacked, after which they returned to Euboea, their vessels laden with spoils. On their return, the two leaders went to Heraclea to meet with the Aetolians, who under the terms of their treaty, had asked Attalus for a thousand soldiers. He refused, citing the Aetolians' own refusal to honor Attalus' request to attack Macedonia during Philip's attack on Pergamon two years earlier. Resuming operations, Attalus and the Romans attacked but failed to take Oreus and, deciding to leave a small force to invest it, attacked across the strait in Thessaly. When they returned to Oreus, they again attacked, this time successfully, the Romans taking the captives, Attalus the city. The campaigning season now over, Attalus attended the Eleusinian Mysteries and then returned to Pergamon having been away for over two years.

In the spring of 198 BC, Attalus returned to Greece with twenty-three quinqueremes joining a fleet of twenty  Rhodian decked warships at Andros, to complete the conquest of Euboea begun the previous year. Soon joined by the Romans, the combined fleets took Eretria and later Carystus. Thus, the allies controlled all of Euboea except for Chalcis. The allied fleet then sailed for Cenchreae in preparation for an attack on Corinth. Meanwhile, the new Roman consul for that year, Titus Quinctius Flamininus, had learned that the Achaean League, allies of Macedon, had had a change in leadership which favored Rome. With the hope of inducing the Achaeans to abandon Philip and join the allies, envoys were sent, including Attalus himself, to Sicyon, where they offered the incorporation of Corinth into the Achaean League. Attalus apparently so impressed the Sicyonians, that they erected a colossal statue of him in their market place and instituted sacrifices in his honor. A meeting of the League was convened and after a heated debate and the withdrawal of some of delegates the rest agreed to join the alliance. Attalus led his army from Cenchreae (now controlled by the allies) through the Isthmus and attacked Corinth from the north, controlling the access to Lechaeum, the Corinthian port on the Gulf of Corinth, the Romans attacked from the east controlling the approaches to Cenchreae, with the Achaeans attacking from the west controlling the access to the city via the Sicyonian gate. However the city held, and when Macedonian reinforcements arrived, the siege was abandoned. The Achaeans were dismissed, the Romans left for Corcyra, while Attalus sailed for Piraeus.

Early in 197 BC, Flamininus summoned Attalus to join him at Elateia (now in Roman hands) and from there they traveled together to attend a Boeotian council in Thebes to discuss which side Boeotia would take in the war. At the council Attalus spoke first, reminding the Boeotians of the many things he and his ancestors had done for them, but during his address he stopped talking and collapsed, with one side of his body paralyzed. Attalus was taken back to Pergamon, where he died around the time of the Battle of Cynoscephalae, which brought about the end of the Second Macedonian War.

Family
Attalus married Apollonis, from Cyzicus. They had four sons, Eumenes, Attalus, Philetaerus and Athenaeus (after Apollonis' father). Apollonis was thought to be a model of motherly love. Polybius describes Apollonis as "a woman who for many reasons deserves to be remembered, and with honor. Her claims upon a favourable recollection are that, though born of a private family, she became a queen, and retained that exalted rank to the end of her life, not by the use of meretricious fascinations, but by the virtue and integrity of her conduct in private and public life alike. Above all, she was the mother of four sons with whom she kept on terms of the most perfect affection and motherly love to the last day of her life."

The filial affection of the brothers as well as their upbringing is remarked on by several ancient sources. A decree of Antiochus IV praises "king Attalus and queen Apollonis … because of their virtue and goodness, which they preserved for their sons, managing their education in this way wisely and well." An inscription at Pergamon represents Apollonis as saying that "she always considered herself blessed and gave thanks to the gods, not for wealth or empire, but because she saw her three sons guarding the eldest and him reigning without fear among those who were armed." When Attalus died in 197 BC at the age of 72, he was succeeded by his eldest son Eumenes II. Polybius, describing Attalus' life, says "and what is more remarkable than all, though he left four grown-up sons, he so well settled the question of succession, that the crown was handed down to his children's children without a single dispute."

Apollonis died in the mid-second-century BC. In her honor, Attalus' sons built a temple in Cyzicus decorated with bas-reliefs representing several scenes of sons displaying love for their mothers, with one scene also showing love for a father.

Notes

References

Primary sources
Livy, History of Rome, Rev. Canon Roberts (translator), Ernest Rhys (Ed.); (1905) London: J. M. Dent & Sons, Ltd.
Pausanias, Description of Greece, Books I–II, (Loeb Classical Library) translated by W. H. S. Jones; Cambridge, Massachusetts: Harvard University Press; London, William Heinemann Ltd. (1918) .
Polybius, Histories, Evelyn S. Shuckburgh (translator); London, New York. Macmillan (1889); Reprint Bloomington (1962).
Strabo, Geography, Books 13–14, translated by Horace Leonard Jones; Cambridge, Massachusetts: Harvard University Press; London: William Heinemann, Ltd. (1924) .

Secondary sources

 Paton, W. R. (ed.), Greek Anthology, Volume I: Book 1: Christian Epigrams, Book 2: Description of the Statues in the Gymnasium of Zeuxippus, Book 3: Epigrams in the Temple of Apollonis at Cyzicus, Book 4: Prefaces to the Various Anthologies, Book 5: Erotic Epigrams, translated by W. R. Paton. Revised by Michael A. Tueller, Loeb Classical Library No. 67, Cambridge, Massachusetts, Harvard University Press, 2014. . Online version at Harvard University Press.
 Pollitt, Jerome Jordan, Art in the Hellenistic Age, Cambridge University Press, 1986. 

3rd-century BC Greek people
Kings of Pergamon
People from Pergamon
2nd-century BC rulers
3rd-century BC rulers
Cybele
Ancient Olympic competitors
Ancient Greek chariot racers
First Macedonian War
Second Macedonian War
269 BC births
197 BC deaths